Andrew James Keeley (born 16 September 1956 in Basildon) is an English former professional footballer who played for Tottenham Hotspur, Sheffield United, Scunthorpe United and represented England at youth level.

Playing career
Keeley joined Tottenham Hotspur as an apprentice in January 1974. The central defender made his senior debut against Birmingham City on 20 October 1976. Keeley made a total of six appearances  in the season of 1976-77 in which the Spurs were relegated. In December 1977 he was granted a free transfer to Sheffield United and went on to feature in 28 fixtures. After leaving Bramall Lane on a free transfer he signed for Scunthorpe United in July 1981 and made a further 77 appearances and scored once from the penalty spot.

References

External links
Fact-file

1956 births
Living people
Sportspeople from Basildon
English footballers
English Football League players
Tottenham Hotspur F.C. players
Sheffield United F.C. players
Scunthorpe United F.C. players
Association football central defenders